Liis Koger (born December 23, 1989 in Pärnu) is an Estonian painter and poet based in Tallinn.

Education 

Koger graduated from Pärnu Sütevaka High School Of Humanities. She has studied Psychology and Theology at University of Tartu and graduated University of Tartu in 2013 with a BA degree in Painting, Fine Arts.

Paintings 
Paintings by Koger are being shown in public spaces like The Parliament Of Estonia in Toompea, Tallinn, and the Institute Of Mathematical Statistics in Tartu. Her works have also been reproduced for different magazines like HESA Inprint in Finland, Akadeemia in Estonia and used in record designs like Ensemble RESONABILIS "North Wind, South Wind" longplayer.

Selected exhibitions

Personal exhibitions 
 2014 April, Liis Koger – Paintings, SomoS Art House, Berlin, Germany
 2014 January „The Overflowing Effect Of Staying Unset”, Pärnu City Gallery, Pärnu, Estonia
 2013 June „Valgusemängija” [„The Player Of Light“], University Of Tartu Bachelor of Fine Arts exhibition
Tartu Art Museum, Tartu, Estonia
 2013 May–July „Suur helendus“ [„Broad Phosphorescence“], Haus Gallery, Tallinn, Estonia
 2012 October „Kaotatud maailm“ [„Lost World“]
Saaremaa Museum, Kuressaare Castle, Saaremaa, Estonia
 2012 September, Camponeschi, Rome, Italy
curated by Umberto Scrocca and Achille Bonito Oliva
 2012 March „Seal külmas kambris tulid…“ [„In The Cold Chambre Came…“]
National Library of Estonia, Tallinn, Estonia
 2010 March, Bridge Club, Milan, Italy
 2010 March, Twincafe, Lugano, Switzerland
 2010 February, Ellisse Ristorante, Manno, Switzerland

Joint exhibitions 

 2013 September–October „Kunstnikult raamatukogule” [„For Library From Artist”], National Library Of Estonia, Tallinn, Estonia
 2013 June–July Estonian Painters’ Association exhibition „M“, Vaal Gallery, Tallinn, Estonia
 2013 May–June International Painting Biennial Chisinau 2013, Chisinau, Moldova
 2013 April Spring exhibition, the 13th annual exhibition of Estonian Artists’ Association, Tallinn Art Hall, Tallinn, Estonia
 2013 March New works of Estonian painters, The Museum of New Art, Pärnu, Estonia
 2013 February Estonian – Luxembourg artists in dialogue, Konschthaus Beim Engel, Luxembourg
 2012 October Chelsea Town Hall, London, UK
 2011 December – 2012 January Tartu Art House end of year exhibition, Tartu, Estonia
 2011 June exposition „BACA-BACA“, Tartu Art House, Tartu, Estonia
 2011 May Estonian Painters’ Association exhibition „Mida oskad sina teha valge värviga?“
[ „What You Can Do With White Colour?“], Vaal Gallery, Tallinn, Estonia
 2010 September Tartu Young Art exhibition „Vali vitamiin!“ [„Choose Vitamine!“], Tartu, Estonia

Selected publications

Poetry 
 2014 September poetry collection "Igaviku kingad" [„Eternity Shoes“] - Publisher: ERP, Tallinn
 2012 November poetry collection “Vana kuu hea and” [„Old Moon´s Good Gift“] - Publisher: Eesti Keele Sihtasutus [Foundation of Estonian Language], Tallinn
 2011 May poetry collection „Tantsud armastuse lõppu“ [„Dances To The End Of Love“] - Publisher: Fantaasia, Tartu

Articles 
 Karin Klaus „Paintings, Washed With Rain And Wind“ („Maalid, mida silusid vihm ja tuul”), Pärnu Postimees, 15/01/2014
 Eleen Änilane „Liis Koger: Sometimes You need to live out of air and love. Living without air would be much worse“ („Liis Koger: Vahel tuleb ikka vaid õhust ja armastusest ära elada. Õhuta olemine oleks palju hullem”), Pärnu Postimees, 12/09/2013
 Kadri Asmer „The Art of Liis Koger: conversations and outlooks“ („Liis Kogre kunst: vestlused ja vaatlused”), Sirp, 20/06/2013

References

External links 
 Community
 Peripheral ARTeries Art Review, 26/03/2013
 The Frankly Speaking, Liis(23), 03/03/2013

1989 births
Living people
Estonian women poets
People from Pärnu
University of Tartu alumni
21st-century Estonian painters
21st-century Estonian poets
21st-century Estonian women artists
21st-century Estonian women writers